Nicholas Baird (born 11 January 1955) is a British auto racing driver.

Career
He competed in the British Sports 2000 Championship between 1986 and 1988, winning the best newcomer award in his debut season. In 1988, he finished second overall, winning his class. For 1989, he competed in the British Sportscar Championship. In 1990, he stepped up to the British Touring Car Championship, driving a BMW 318is he finished 22nd overall. He returned for a second season in 1991, driving for Tech-Speed Motorsport he finished 21st with two championship points.

Racing Record

Complete British Touring Car Championship results
(key) (Races in bold indicate pole position – 1990 in class) (Races in italics indicate fastest lap)

References

External links
Nick Baird at BTCC Pages

1955 births
Living people
British Touring Car Championship drivers